Langhorne may refer to:

Places 
 Langhorne, Pennsylvania
 Langhorne Speedway
 Langhorne (SEPTA station)
 Langhorne Manor, Pennsylvania, borough in Bucks County, Pennsylvania
 Langhorne Creek, South Australia

People 
 Nancy Witcher Langhorne, bka Nancy Astor (1879–1964), American-born first woman British MP
 Langhorne Bond (born 1937), U.S. federal administrator
 Langhorne Slim (born 1980), American country singer
 Algernon Philip Yorke Langhorne (1882–1945), Major-General in the British Army
 Bruce Langhorne (1938–2017), American folk musician
 Cary DeVall Langhorne (1873–1948), American Medal of Honor recipient
 Crystal Langhorne (born 1986), American basketball player
 Francis Harold Langhorne (1892–1918), Lieutenant in the 2nd Canadian Mounted Rifles killed in action at Cambrai
 Harold Stephen Langhorne (1866–1932), Brigadier-General in the British Army in the First World War
 James Archibald Dunboyne Langhorne (1878–1950), Brigadier in the British Army
 Jeremiah Langhorne (died 1742), prominent landowner and jurist in colonial Pennsylvania
 John Langhorne (poet) (1735–1779), English poet and clergyman
 John Langhorne (1805–1881), mathematics master of Giggleswick School
 John Langhorne (1862–1925), master of Loretto School and headmaster of the Dean Orphanage Charity School later known as the John Watson's Institution in Edinburgh
 Reverend John Langhorne (1836–1911), master of Tonbridge School and headmaster of The King's School, Rochester
 Michael Langhorne Astor (1916–1980), British politician
 Reggie Langhorne (born 1963), American football player
 Samuel Langhorne Clemens (1835–1910), author, pen name Mark Twain
 Reverend Thomas Langhorne (born 1797), founder of Loretto School
 Sir William Langhorne, 1st Baronet (c. 1631–1715), merchant, landowner and Governor of Madras